Bishr ibn Dawud al-Muhallabi was a governor of al-Sind for the Abbasid Caliphate, serving during the caliphate of al-Ma'mun.

Career
A member of the Muhallabid family, Bishr was the son of Dawud ibn Yazid, who had served as the governor of al-Sind since the caliphate of al-Rashid. After Yazid died in 820 or 821, Bishr succeeded his father and took over the government of al-Sind. Al-Ma'mun agreed to recognize him as governor, on the condition that Bishr send a million dirhams in tribute to him on an annual basis.

In spite of this agreement, however, Bishr soon decided to rebel against the caliph, and stopped forwarding any money to Baghdad. In response, al-Ma'mun placed an army under the command of Hajib ibn Salih in 826 and instructed him to reassert caliphal control over al-Sind. Bishr, however, defeated Hajib and forced him to retreat from the province. Following this, al-Ma'mun invested Ghassan ibn 'Abbad with the governorship of al-Sind and sent him to defeat Bishr. This time, Bishr decided to surrender and requested that Ghassan give him a guarantee of safe conduct. This was granted, and Bishr returned with Ghassan to Iraq in 831.

Notes

References
Al-Baladhuri, Ahmad ibn Jabir. The Origins of the Islamic State, Part II. Trans. Francis Clark Murgotten. New York: Columbia University, 1924.
Crone, Patricia. "Muhallabids." The Encyclopaedia of Islam, Volume VII. New Ed. Leiden: E. J. Brill, 1993.  
Al-Tabari, Abu Ja'far Muhammad ibn Jarir. The History of al-Tabari, Volume XXXII: The Reunification of the 'Abbasid Caliphate. Trans. Clifford Edmund Bosworth. Ed. Ehsan Yar-Shater. Albany, NY: State University of New York Press, 1987. 
Al-Ya'qubi, Ahmad ibn Abu Ya'qub. Historiae, Vol. 2. Ed. M. Th. Houtsma. Leiden: E. J. Brill, 1883.

Abbasid governors of Sind
Muhallabids
9th-century Arabs
9th-century rulers in Asia